BitLord is a proprietary adware BitTorrent client available for Microsoft Windows, macOS and Android.

History
BitLord was first released in December 2004, as BitLord 0.56, based on and under license from BitComet. From version 1.2 until 2.3.2, BitLord was based on Deluge, but has added several features of its own since then.

BitLord is (as of version 2.4) built using Python and the Qt cross-platform framework, and uses the libtorrent-rasterbar C++ library.

Security
Upon download, BitLord will recommend other programs, such as Opera and Avast Antivirus, both of which are often bundled with software such as BitLord and might be considered unwanted by the user.

References

External links
 BitLord website

Android (operating system) software
BitTorrent clients
C++ software
Adware
MacOS file sharing software
Windows file sharing software
File sharing software that uses GTK

sv:BitComet#BitLord